A captive bolt (also variously known as a captive bolt gun, cattle gun, stunbolt gun, bolt gun, or stunner) is a device used for stunning animals prior to slaughter.

The goal of captive bolt stunning is to inflict a forceful strike on the forehead with the bolt in order to induce unconsciousness. For the non-penetrating bolt gun variation, the bolt may or may not destroy part of the brain, while brain tissue is always destroyed with the penetrating bolt gun.

The bolt consists of a heavy rod made of corrosion-resistant alloys, such as stainless steel. It is held in position inside the barrel of the stunner by means of rubber washers. The bolt is usually not visible in a stunner in good condition. The bolt is actuated by a trigger pull and is propelled forward by compressed air, a spring mechanism, or by the discharge of a blank round ignited by a firing pin. After striking a shallow but forceful blow on the forehead of the animal, spring tension causes the bolt to recoil back into the barrel.

The captive bolt pistol was invented in 1903 by Hugo Heiss, former director of a slaughterhouse in Straubing, Germany.

Variations
Captive bolt pistols are of three types: penetrating, non-penetrating, and free bolt. The use of penetrating captive bolts has largely been discontinued in commercial situations in order to minimize the risk of transmission of disease. 

In the penetrating type, the stunner uses a pointed bolt which is propelled by pressurized air, spring mechanism, or a blank cartridge. The bolt penetrates the skull of the animal, enters the cranium, and catastrophically damages the cerebrum and part of the cerebellum. Concussion causes destruction of vital centers of the brain and an increase in intracranial pressure, causing the animal to lose consciousness. This method is currently the most effective type of stunning, since it physically destroys brain matter (increasing the probability of a successful stun), while also leaving the brain stem intact and thus ensuring the heart continues to pump during the exsanguination. One disadvantage of this method is that brain matter is allowed to enter the blood stream, possibly contaminating other tissue with bovine spongiform encephalopathy (BSE, colloquially known as mad cow disease).

The action of a non-penetrating stunner is similar, but the bolt is blunt with a mushroom-shaped tip. The bolt strikes the forehead with great force and immediately retracts. The subsequent concussion is responsible for the unconsciousness of the animal. This type of stunner is less reliable at causing immediate unconsciousness than penetrating types; however, it has undergone a resurgence of popularity because of concerns about mad cow disease.  In the European Union, this captive bolt design is required for slaughter of animals that will be used for pharmaceutical manufacture.

The free bolt stunner is used for emergency, in-the-field euthanasia of large farm-animals that cannot be restrained. It differs from a true captive bolt gun in that the projectile is not retractable; it is similar in operation to a powder-actuated nail gun or conventional firearm. Capable of firing only when pressed firmly against a surface (typically the animal's forehead), the device fires a small projectile through the animal's skull. The veterinarian can then either leave the animal to die from the projectile wound or administer lethal drugs.

Use
With cattle, goats, sheep, rabbits, and horses, failure to adequately stun using a penetrating stunner can largely be attributed to incorrect positioning. Captive bolts allow for meat trimmings from the head to be salvaged. In some veal operations, a non-penetrating concussive stunner is used in order to preserve the brains for further processing.

Captive bolt stunners are safer to use in most red meat slaughter situations. There is no danger of ricochet or over-penetration as there is with regular firearms.

Use for homicide
There have been a number of cases where a captive bolt pistol has been used for homicide, including:
 In 1991, a 46-year old German man with a history of alcohol abuse and aggressive behaviour killed his wife.
 In 2009, a 40-year old English slaughterhouse worker killed a woman with two shots to the chest.

In fiction
 In the TV series Bones the mother of protagonist Temperance "Bones" Brennan is discovered to have been murdered with a captive bolt pistol, which convicts a suspected hitman who evaded arrest for decades due to his favored murder weapon being unknown prior to his capture.
 In the novel No Country for Old Men and its film adaptation, Anton Chigurh uses a captive bolt pistol as a murder weapon, as well as an impromptu breaking-and-entering device.
 In Austrian director Michael Haneke's 1992 film Benny's Video, the murder of a young girl is perpetrated with a captive bolt pistol.
 In the 2017 film  It, protagonist Bill Denbrough used the bolt pistol on Pennywise.
 The song "Captive Bolt Pistol" by British death metal band Carcass describes the use of captive bolt pistols for slaughtering cattle and humans.
 A veterinarian's "horse gun" is used as a murder weapon in the episode entitled "Confection" of the British TV series Endeavour.
 In the 2020 film Bloodshot, Martin Axe uses a captive bolt gun to kill Ray's wife, Gina.
 In Fear the Walking Dead (season 1, episode 6), it is explained that a captive bolt pistol is used to prevent the dead from turning.
 In the CSI: Miami episode "And They're Offed", a captive bolt gun is used to kill a racehorse owner.
 In the movie The Butcher Boy, Francie Brady kills his neighbor with a bolt gun.
 In the TV series Haven, "the bolt gun killer" is a serial killer who kills women with a bolt gun.
 In the Netflix series Welcome to Eden, a captive bolt pistol is used to kill people on the dystopian island of Eden.
 In the CSI: Vegas episode "In the White Room", a captive bolt gun is used to kill three people.
Furthermore, in the episode "Ashes, Ashes", the same captive bolt gun is used to kill Dr. Auerbach.

References

External links

AVMA Guidelines for the Euthanasia of Animals: 2013 Edition

Firearms
Meat industry
Animal killing
Farming tools